Bozai Gumbaz or Baza'i Gonbad is the site of a domed tomb (or gonbad) and nearby settlement of Kyrgyz and Wakhi herders in the Wakhan District of Afghanistan. It lies in the Little Pamir on the right bank of the Bozai River, near where it joins Wakhjir River to become the Wakhan River,

There is no evidence to indicate that the local Pamir Mountains had ever earlier supported permanent settlements. While debris of mud buildings and similar constructions can occasionally be found, they are generally seen as only indicating relatively recent occupation and have little if any evidence of a permanent character. The shrines and tombs scattered throughout the area are all of a comparatively recent character. There are also the remains of a small fort can be found near this location. It is said to have been built by Bozai, a Kyrgyz chief.

Baza'i Gonbad was the scene of a minor incident during the Great Game. In 1891 the Russians sent a small military force to the area.  The British Captain Francis Younghusband, in the course of his Pamir expedition, encountered the Russians at Baza'i Gonbad, and the Russians ordered him out of the area.  The Russians subsequently apologised for the incident.

Climate
Baza'i Gonbad is at extreme altitude, experiencing an alpine tundra climate (Köppen: ET), bordering on a subarctic climate (Dfc) that close to a monsoon-influenced subarctic climate (Dwc). The average annual temperature is  resulting in long, very cold winters and brief, cool summers.

References

External links
 Satellite map at Maplandia.com

Populated places in Wakhan District
Wakhan